The 2003 Copa del Rey Final was the 101st final since its establishment. The match took place on 28 June 2003 at the Estadio Manuel Martínez Valero, Elche. The match was contested by RCD Mallorca and Recreativo de Huelva, and it was refereed by Eduardo Iturralde González. RCD Mallorca lifted the trophy for the first time in their history with a 3-0 victory over Recreativo de Huelva.

Match details

External links
Review of the event at Marca.com
Linguasport

References

2003
1
Recreativo Huelva matches
RCD Mallorca matches